Ludwig Elsbett (8 November 1913  – 28 March 2003) was the inventor of the Elsbett Engine.

Elsbett was one of nine children of the farmer Viktor Elsbett and his wife Maria. He grew up in agriculture, and was originally trained as a fitter for agricultural machinery. Later, he attended the technical schools in Bad Frankenhausen and Neustrelitz to study mechanical engineering and aircraft engines, and became a mechanical engineer.

In 1937, he was appointed department manager at the Junkers Aircraft Works in Dessau and developed combustion engines. In 1940, he married his wife Lieselotte, and had five children with her. He was a living legend of technology; he played a decisive role in the further development of diesel engine technology.

After the war, Elsbett set up an independent factory in Salzgitter for the production of a small two-stroke diesel engine.

In 1973 Elsbett gained international recognition for the first ever serial-produced direct-injection diesel engine for cars.

In 1977 Elsbett produced an engine fuelled by vegetable oil called the Elsbett-motor.

In 1980 Elsbett made the first conversion of standard diesel cars with prechamber engines to vegetable oil.

In 1993 the Elsbett Mercedes won the first Eco Tour of Europe with the lowest consumption of fuel.

In 1997 Elsbett won the European Solar Prize.

In 2002 Elsbett converted the standard common-rail car engine and unit-injector truck engine to run on bio-diesel.

There is now an Elsbett Museum in the city of Salz, Bavaria, Lower Franconia.

See also 
 Elsbett Engine
 Fuel injection

External links 
 www.elsbett.com
 Web site of Elsbett Museum (in German language)

1913 births
2003 deaths
People from Rhön-Grabfeld
People from the Kingdom of Bavaria
Engineers from Bavaria
20th-century German inventors
German designers

fr:Moteur Elsbett
it:Motore Elsbett
pl:Elsbett